Basavilbaso is a town in the center region of the province of Entre Ríos, Argentina, about  from Concepción del Uruguay. Locals often shorten the name to Basso.

The town developed around the Gobernador Basavilbaso Station of the Ferrocarril Central Entrerriano railway company, which became part of Entre Ríos Railway in 1892. The first train arrived on 30 June 1887, and this is now regarded as the foundation date of Basavilbaso.

The town was first settled by Russian Jewish immigrants basically from Ukraine (Kherson Oblast) and Bessarabia. Basavilbaso was one of the first Jewish colonies in Argentina. These settlers formed the first agricultural cooperative in South America.

As "Jewish gauchos", they were recognized as the first to farm in an area where farming was non-existent. Other groups began to settle in the town: Italians, Volga Germans, and Russians.

See also 

 History of the Jews in Argentina

References

 
 TurismoEntreRios.com - Touristic portal.
 BassoEnLaRed.com.ar- Portal of the town.
 Rielfm.com.ar- News

German-Argentine culture
Italian-Argentine culture
Jewish Argentine settlements
Moldovan-Jewish diaspora
Populated places in Entre Ríos Province
Ukrainian diaspora in Argentina
Ukrainian-Jewish diaspora
Volga German diaspora
Russian diaspora in South America
Russian-Jewish diaspora
Cities in Argentina
Argentina
Entre Ríos Province